Olga is an unincorporated community and census-designated place (CDP) in Lee County, Florida, United States. The population was 1,952 at the 2010 census, up from 1,398 at the 2000 census. It is part of the Cape Coral-Fort Myers, Florida Metropolitan Statistical Area.

Geography
Olga is located in northeastern Lee County at  (26.715310, -81.702539), on the south side of the Caloosahatchee River. It is bordered to the east and north by Alva and to the west by Fort Myers Shores. Florida State Road 80 passes through the CDP, leading southwest  to the center of Fort Myers, the county seat, and east  to LaBelle.

Demographics

As of the census of 2000, there were 1,398 people, 515 households, and 402 families residing in the CDP. The racial makeup of the CDP was 90.34% White, 2.36% African American, 0.36% Native American, 1.22% Asian, 4.43% from other races, and 1.29% from two or more races.  9.08% of the population were Hispanic or Latino of any race.

There were 515 households, out of which 36.3% had children under the age of 18 living with them, 61.9% were married couples living together, 12.6% had a female householder with no husband present, and 21.9% were non-families. 18.1% of all households were made up of individuals, and 7.4% had someone living alone who was 65 years of age or older.  The average household size was 2.71 and the average family size was 3.04.

In the CDP, the population was spread out, with 26.3% under the age of 18, 7.4% from 18 to 24, 29.1% from 25 to 44, 24.5% from 45 to 64, and 12.7% who were 65 years of age or older.  The median age was 38 years.  For every 100 females, there were 96.3 males.  For every 100 females age 18 and over, there were 96.2 males.

The median income for a household in the CDP was $55,000, and the median income for a family was $57,298. Males had a median income of $31,604 versus $23,333 for females. The per capita income for the CDP was $19,826.  4.0% of the population and 4.0% of families were below the poverty line.  Out of the total population, 4.5% of those under the age of 18 and none of those 65 and older were living below the poverty line.

References

Census-designated places in Lee County, Florida
Census-designated places in Florida